In Mali, football is played widely and followed avidly, football is the most popular sport in Mali. Large professional clubs and international competition draw much popular attention, and the sport is played as a pastime.

Popularity
The most popular sport in Mali is football, which rose to the level of national obsession when Mali was chosen to host the 2002 African Cup of Nations.  Most towns have professional or semi-professional men's clubs which play in one national (professional) league and two regional (semi professional) leagues. A majority of clubs are based in Bamako, the capital city, and the most popular teams nationally, Djoliba AC, Stade Malien, and Real Bamako, all play there.

People play football widely, with formal fields in almost every town of any size, and pickup games among children common in a country with few luxuries. Informal games are often played by youths using a bundle of rags as a ball.

Professional game
Men's football has so far outpaced the women's game—or any other sport—as the focus of public attention as a spectator sport.

History

The French introduced the game to what was then French Soudan in the early 20th century, and the first organised leagues open to Africans appeared in the 1930s.  Jeanne d'Arc du Soudan, founded in 1938 by two French-Africans and the missionary Révérend Père Bouvier, borrowed its name from the Senegalese club Jeanne d'Arc Dakar, and was originally a club of mixed race Bamako Metis playing against white colonials. A handful of African clubs developed after the Second World War, competing locally and against teams from around French West Africa, dominated by the clubs of Senegal.  Foyer du Soudan (later Djoliba AC) and JA du Soudan competed in the French West African Cup from the late 1940s until 1959, as well as local leagues (Bamako League)   and the "coupe du Soudan" (1947-1959).

Domestic league
 
At independence, the new government reorganised the sport leagues, combining a number of the larger teams with nearby clubs.  Most notably, two Bamako clubs fused into teams which still dominate national sport, to become Djoliba Athletic Club and Stade Malien de Bamako in 1960.  In the first Coupe du Mali, Stade and Djoliba reached the two match final in 1961.  Tied 3-3 after the first match, Stade carried the cup 2-1 in the second.

Stade were also the first Malian club to reach the final of the African Cup of Champions Clubs in 1964/5, losing 2-1 to Oryx Douala.

The great Salif Keita brought AS Real Bamako dominance in his time there (1963-1967). He later moved on to France, becoming the first Malian star player in Europe while at AS Saint-Étienne and  Olympique de Marseille.  At Saint-Étienne, Keita won the African Footballer of the Year in 1970, the first Malian to win the award, and later played in Spain, Portugal, and the United States.

New clubs have appeared, but the three big Bamako clubs have maintained a strangle on Malian football.  Every top division league title since 1966 has been won by one of these Stade, Djoliba, or Real, and all but five times since 1961 have these clubs won the Coupe du Mali.

Overseas players

In a path blazed by Keita, the country has produced several other notable players for French teams, including Jean Tigana, and  Frédéric "Fredi" Kanouté, named 2007 African Footballer of the Year, but latterly elected to play for Mali instead. Mahamadou Diarra, the captain of the Mali national team, played for Real Madrid for four seasons before moving to AS Monaco and Seydou Keita plays for AS Roma. Other notable players currently on European squads include, Drissa Diakité (SC Bastia), Modibo Maïga (West Ham United), Adama Coulibaly (Valenciennes FC), Cheick Diabaté (FC Girondins de Bordeaux), and Yacouba Sylla (Stade Rennais F.C.).

International competition

See also
List of Malian football clubs
List of Malian football competitions
List of Malian football referees
List of Malian footballers
List of Football venues in Mali
2002 African Cup of Nations: hosted by Mali
Malian Football Federation
Mali national football team

External links
mali.viky.net: Football News from the Malian national press service.

References

Mali: Goal Program, FIFA.
Sport in Mali, Oxfam.
Fifa.com: Updated results and table from Mali Premiere League.
RSSSF 2007/08 competition history

 Hudgens, Jim, Richard Trillo, and Nathalie Calonnec. The Rough Guide to West Africa. Rough Guides (2003). .
 Milet, Eric & Jean-Luc Manaud. Mali. Editions Olizane (2007). .